Pere Macias i Arau (born 14 June 1956 Olot), is a Catalan politician, deputy to the Parliament of Catalonia and to the Parliament and senator.

Biography 
Pere Macias is an Engineer of Channels and Ports and teacher at the Polytechnical University of Catalonia. He is a member of Democratic Convergence of Catalonia since the 1977. He was mayor of Olot from March 1984 until June 1996. He was vice-president of the Deputation of Girona from 1987 until 1994 and president since the October of the 1994 until June 1996. From 1995 until July 1996 was president of the Catalan Association of Municipalities and Comarques.

In 1995, Macias was the head of list for the demarcation of Girona to the Elections to the Parliament of Catalonia, and was chosen deputy to the Parliament of Catalonia. He was appointed Councillor of Medium Ambient and House of the Generality of Catalonia, substituting for Albert Vilalta and González in the restructuring of the government that there was on 7 June 1996. He held this office until 30 July 1997, when he occupied the Council of Territorial Politics and Public Works substituting for Artur Mas. He held this office until 21 November 2001, when Felip Puig substituted.

In December 2001, he was appointed Secretary General Adjunct of the Federation of Convergence and Union and in January 2002 was appointed Secretary General Adjunct of Democratic Convergence of Catalonia. He was the Spokesperson of CiU to the Spanish Senate.

In the 2008 Spanish general elections, he was the number two of the candidature of Convergence and Union to the Congress of Deputies for Barcelona, last of Josep Antoni Duran and Lleida. He was chosen deputy again to the Spanish general elections of 2011.

On 14 October 2015 he announced that he left the political office to work for renewal to the party.

References 

1956 births
Living people
Academic staff of the Polytechnic University of Catalonia
Public works ministers of Catalonia